The following are the national records in speed skating in Latvia maintained by Latvian Skating Association (LSA).

Men

Women

References

External links
 LSA official website

National records in speed skating
Speed skating-related lists
Records
Speed skating
Speed skating